Villa del Río is a city located in the province of Córdoba, Spain. According to the 2006 census (INE), the city has a population of 7433 inhabitants.

References

External links
Villa del Río - Web oficial del Ayuntamiento de Villa del Río

Municipalities in the Province of Córdoba (Spain)